Natham Patti is a village in Srivilliputhur taluk, Virudhunagar district in the Indian state of Tamil Nadu. It is on National Highway 208, about 58 km south-west of Madurai and well connected by road with Madurai, Tenkasi. It has more than 1000 families.

Natham Patti is near Srivilliputtur (15 km) and Madurai (50 km).

Educational institutions

Schools
R.C High School

Church
St.Xavier's Church

Climate
Temperature range is 20 °C to 37 °C.It has a high mean temperature and a low degree of humidity. The climate of the village ranges from dry sub-humid to semi-arid. The village has three distinct periods of rainfall: (1) Advancing monsoon period, South West monsoon (from June to September), with strong southwest winds; (2) North East monsoon (from October to December), with dominant northeast winds; and (3) Dry season (from January to May).

Villages in Virudhunagar district